Funoon  was an Urdu literary magazine published by Ahmad Nadeem Qasimi from Lahore, Pakistan. The magazine was started by Ahmed Nadeem Qasmi and Habib Ashar in 1963. The magazine ceased publication in July 2006. Its publication was restarted in 2009.

Introduction 
Funoon's main purpose was to bring new and fresh talent to recognition. Ahmad Nadeem Qasmi was the first editor of this magazine. He used to make selections and edit the magazine till 2006.

Sections 
The major sections that were always a part of Funoon magazine are: 
 Tanqeedi mazameen (Essays)
 Ghazlen
 Nazmen (Poems)
 Afsanay (Short stories)
 Funoon e latifa (Fine arts)
 Mazah (Humor)
 Inshaiya (Article)

Restart of publication 
The publication of Funoon magazine was restarted in 2009, by Naheed Qasmi and Nayyer Hayat Qasmi. Since then, it is being published continually. Till July 2016, its 137 volumes have been published.

Numbers 
There are various numbers published, some of them are "Mirza Ghalib" , "Khadija Mastoor" , "Akhtar Hussain Jafri" , "Parveen Shakir" and "Jadeed Urdu Ghazal Number".

Titles 
The first title of Funoon magazine was composed by artist Abd-ur-Rehman Chughtai. Later, most of the titles were prepared by artist, Basheer Mujid. Now its titles are designed by Nafisa Hayat Qasmi.

References

1963 establishments in Pakistan
2006 disestablishments in Pakistan
Defunct literary magazines
Defunct magazines published in Pakistan
Magazines established in 1963
Magazines disestablished in 2006
Literary magazines published in Pakistan
Urdu-language magazines
Mass media in Lahore